Heswall railway station is a railway station on the eastern edge of the town of Heswall on the Wirral Peninsula in England. It is on the Borderlands Line. The station and all trains serving it are operated by Transport for Wales. In 2008 the station was refurbished. The station was previously known as Heswall Hills, as there was previously another station serving Heswall, on the Birkenhead Railway's branch line from West Kirby to Hooton, that is now a footpath known as the Wirral Way.

History
Construction began in 1892; the line went through several changes of name, and by the time of its opening (goods 16 March 1896, passengers 18 May), was known as the North Wales and Liverpool Joint Railway.

A station known as Heswall Hills was opened two years later, on 1 May 1898. The MS&LR in due course became the Great Central Railway (GCR), which absorbed the WMCQ on 1 January 1905, so that by the time of the 1923 Grouping the line was wholly owned by the GCR, and so became part of the London and North Eastern Railway on 1 January 1923.

Heswall Hills station was renamed Heswall on 7 May 1973.

Freight and goods
The station had an extensive goods yard with sidings to the south-west of the station, where daily shunting operations were carried out until the advent of diesel railcar operations in 1960, at which time light freight operations ceased. Although, the yard was still used until 30 October 1965. The goods yard and sidings were sold off for housing development in about 1967.

However, the line continued to be used for heavy freight, as iron ore freight trains also passed through the station. These freight trains operated from Bidston Dock to the John Summers steelworks in Shotton. The steam locomotives could be heard at night for at least five miles climbing Storeton Bank, from Upton station to Heswall. The Class 9F locomotive 92203, later named as Black Prince, worked the final steam-hauled iron ore train in November 1967. The freight service itself ended around 1980.

Future
Proposals have been put forward to electrify the track as part of the Borderlands Electrification scheme. Merseyrail would like to see the line electrified to link with its own third-rail service, with a doubling of the frequency of services. This would allow the station to serve as a part of a direct service to Liverpool.

In June 2018 it was announced that, as part of the new KeolisAmey franchise to operate the Wales and Borders rail service, the frequency of trains on the line would increase to 2tph from December 2021. However in September 2021, this was delayed to May 2022. 

In May 2022, the planned timetable with the increased service was revised with the additional services removed, therefore any increase in frequency was scrapped for May 2022, due to timetable conflict with freight services, the service frequency increase has not been approved by the Office of Rail and Road.

Facilities
The station facilities are somewhat rudimentary, and the station is unstaffed at nearly all times. Each of the two platforms has a waiting shelter with seating. There is a payphone, and live departure and arrival screens for passenger information, but no booking office. There is a small station car park, with space for 16 cars. Wheelchair and pram access to the platforms is possible, via the access ramps.

Services
From Monday to Saturday, there is an hourly service between Bidston and Wrexham Central (two-hourly in the evening and on public holidays). There is a service every 90 minutes each way on Sundays. Services are provided by an Transport for Wales Class 150/2 "Sprinter" DMU.

References

Bibliography

External links

Railway stations in the Metropolitan Borough of Wirral
DfT Category F2 stations
Former Great Central Railway stations
Railway stations in Great Britain opened in 1898
Railway stations served by Transport for Wales Rail